The Met Breuer was a museum of modern and contemporary art at Madison Avenue and East 75th Street in the Upper East Side of Manhattan, New York City. It served as a branch museum of the Metropolitan Museum of Art (known as the Met) from 2016 to 2020.

The Met Breuer opened in March 2016 in the Breuer Building formerly occupied by the Whitney Museum of American Art, designed by Marcel Breuer and completed in 1966. Its works came from the Met's collection, and it housed both monographic and thematic exhibitions.

In June 2020, it was announced that the museum would close permanently, never reopening after its closure in March 2020 due to the COVID-19 pandemic. Control of the building was transferred to the Frick Collection for its use during renovations to the Frick's main building, an arrangement which predated the COVID outbreak.

History

In 2008, the idea behind the Met Breuer project was initiated by philanthropist Leonard Lauder. An agreement between the Met and the Whitney was signed, after three years of negotiation, in 2011.

The location opened in March 2016 following a year and a half of preparations as part of a $600 million Metropolitan Museum of Art renovation plan. Architects Beyer Blinder Belle updated the Met Breuer building, which had been designed by Marcel Breuer. The Met allocated an annual operating budget of $17 million to run the museum as part of an integrated expansion of the main museum's outreach, with a focus on modern art. The Met has an eight-year lease on the building from the Whitney Museum, with the option to renew another five and a half years, until approximately 2029.

The Met Breuer was overseen by Sheena Wagstaff, previously at the Tate Modern, who has been the head of the Modern and Contemporary Art Department of the Met since 2012. Director and CEO of the Met, Thomas P. Campbell, spearheaded the effort with a stated focus on the digital (moving from analog to digital) and focusing on accessibility and outreach. He considered the Met to be the largest encyclopedic museum in the world, with the Met Breuer an important part of that, especially as it works towards meaningfully engaging with a global audience, as well as the visitors who come to the museum in person. Both Campbell and Wagstaff saw the Met Breuer as a sculptural creation and artwork in its own right.

The opening featured a survey of Nasreen Mohamedi and "Unfinished: Thoughts Left Visible", an exhibit of incomplete works that ranged over 500 years, from Italian Renaissance to contemporary paintings. The exhibit notably featured Pablo Picasso's never-before-exhibited 1931 painting Woman in a Red Armchair as well as work by Kerry James Marshall, whose retrospective exhibition “Mastry” appeared at the Met Breuer in the autumn and winter of 2016–7.

In September 2018, it was announced that the Met intended to vacate the Met Breuer three years early, in 2020, with the Frick Collection temporarily occupying the space while its main building underwent renovations. Originally, the intention was that the Met would vacate the Met Breuer building in July following an exhibition of the works of Gerhard Richter. However, the onset of the COVID-19 pandemic forced the museum to close on March 13, just eight days after the Richter exhibit opened. In June 2020, it was announced that the Met Breuer would close permanently, with the Frick Collection occupying the building, as planned. The building subsequently reopened as the Frick Madison on March 18, 2021

Reception

In advance of the Met Breuer's opening, The New York Times art critic Roberta Smith wrote that the Metropolitan Museum of Art and other major art institutions feared to miss out as the rest of the art world displayed more contemporary art exhibitions. Smith said that the Met excelled at "bringing older art to life" and that the Met Breuer's cautious opening exhibit showed unclear goals for the new building. Wallpaper cited the renovations involved in the opening as being more representative of Breuer's design for the building, with a lower level sunken garden and a more welcoming emphasis on the sculptural design. The Architect's Newspaper sees the Met's approach as one that treats the building itself as an artwork versus a building, with a focus on the patina of the materials as part of a holistic entity.

Critics of the new endeavor challenged its mission to be less safe and salubratory, with a focus on engagement and innovation. The Met Breuer was to address the lack of collection activity of modern and contemporary art in the early to mid-1900s.

Exhibitions

 2016: Nasreen Mohamedi
 2016: "Unfinished: Thoughts Left Visible"
2016: "Humor and Fantasy—The Berggruen Paul Klee Collection"
2016: "diane arbus: in the beginning"
2016: "Kerry James Marshall: Mastry"
2017: "Marisa Merz: The Sky Is a Great Space"
2017: "Marsden Hartley's Maine"
2017: "Lygia Pape: A Multitude of Forms"
2017: "The Body Politic: Video from The Met Collection"
2017: "Ettore Sottsass: Design Radical"
2017: "Modernism on the Ganges: Raghubir Singh Photographs"
2017: "Delirious: Art at the Limits of Reason, 1950–1980"
2017: "Edvard Munch: Between the Clock and the Bed"
2017: "Provocations: Anselm Kiefer at The Met Breuer"
2018: "Leon Golub: Raw Nerve"
2018: "Like Life: Sculpture, Color, and the Body (1300–Now)"
2018: "Obsession: Nudes by Klimt, Schiele, and Picasso from the Scofield Thayer Collection"
2018: "Odyssey: Jack Whitten Sculpture, 1963–2017"
2018: "Everything Is Connected: Art and Conspiracy"
2019: "Lucio Fontana: On the Threshold"
2019: "Siah Armajani: Follow This Line"
2019: "Home Is a Foreign Place: Recent Acquisitions in Context"
2019: "Oliver Beer: Vessel Orchestra"
2019: "Phenomenal Nature: Mrinalini Mukherjee"
2019: "Vija Celmins: To Fix the Image in Memory"
2020: "Gerhard Richter: Painting After All"

Gallery

References

Further reading

External links

 
 The Met Breuer Architecture Tour: Audio Guide

2016 establishments in New York City
Art museums established in 2016
Art museums and galleries in New York City
Contemporary art galleries in the United States
Marcel Breuer buildings
Museums in Manhattan
Museums of American art
Metropolitan Museum of Art